DIN Standard DIN 47100 regulated the color-coding for the identification of cores in telecommunication cables. The standard was withdrawn without a replacement in November 1998, but remains in widespread use by cable manufacturers.

The isolations of the several wires in a cable are either solidly colored in one color, or striped lengthwise in two colors.  Use of the three-colored wires numbered 45 and up is rare.

References

See also
25-pair color code

47100